Bob Sallese is an American, New York City-based manager and record producer, known for his involvement in the city's punk rock and hardcore scene in the early 1980s. Sallese managed the band Ism and co-produced their Diet For the Worms LP on his S.I.N. Records label. He also produced the compilation albums The Big Apple Rotten To The Core Vol. 1 and 2 on S.I.N. Records and Raw Power Records.

According to George Hurchalla's book Going Underground: American Punk, 1979-1992, Sallese and Jism of the band Ism attempted to bring hardcore punk into the mainstream in New York City during the early 1980s. They released the compilation The Big Apple Rotten to the Core, which featured local punk and hardcore bands. The album garnered nationwide airplay, and Ism gained notoriety on college and alternative commercial radio. As a result, WLIR (New York's commercial alternative music station) began adding some hardcore to its playlists and began a late-night hardcore show hosted by Ben Manilla, the first commercial airplay of hardcore in the metropolitan NY area.  Hurchalla writes that Jism and Sallese "had hopes of bringing hardcore into the mainstream" but "many of the new bands wanted to eradicate any taint of older punk from their sound...."

References

External links
 Ism Myspace profile
 The Ism story

Year of birth missing (living people)
Living people
Record producers from New York (state)